The Colombia is a cocktail containing vodka and curaçao.  The layering effect takes advantage of the variation in density and temperature between the layers.  The drink appears as stacked horizontal layers of yellow, blue and red, which matches the three colours of the Colombian flag.

See also
 List of cocktails

References

Cocktails with vodka
Cocktails with triple sec or curaçao
Two-ingredient cocktails